Adolphe Hirsch (21 May 1830 - 16 April 1901) was a German born, Swiss astronomer and geodesist.

Bibliography 
Adolph Hirsch was born in Halberstadt. He studied astronomy at the universities of Heidelberg and Vienna. He founded and directed the Observatory of Neuchâtel which ensured the precise determination of the time for local clock industry. He was also professor of geophysics and astronomy at the Academy of Neuchâtel and secretary then president of the Swiss Geodetic Commission.

In 1866, the Permanent Commission of the Central European Arc Measurement met in Neuchâtel, and Hirsch was appointed, along with Bruhns, of Leipzig, as secretary of the session. The following year, the General Conference of the Central European Arc Measurement, meeting in Berlin, voted a motion in ten articles laying the foundations of the international organization of the metric system, and thus prepared the work which ended on 20 May 1875 with the signing of the Convention of Metre. Throughout the preparatory period Hirsch showed such great activity, such a clear-sighted mind, and identified himself so well with the common work, that he was, by a unanimous vote, chosen as secretary of the new committee in charge of high management of the International Bureau of Weights and Measures. At the same time, the International Geodetic Association was born of the Commission of the Central European Arc Measurement, and, by an understanding the good effects of which were subsequently recognized, it was believed that the two new organizations, which creation had been almost parallel, would benefit from being run by the same men. General Carlos Ibáñez e Ibañez de Ibero, director of the Geodetic and Statistical Institute of Spain, was made chairman of both Commissions and Hirsch became the sole secretary of the International Geodetic Association.

The work of the two Associations is well known: the International Bureau of Weights and Measures, in its twenty-five first years of activity, has ensured the precise unification of the metric system in all civilized countries; The Geodesic Association caused great works, coordinated scattered measurements, made them stand out from each other, and finally, gave us a more perfect knowledge of the shape and dimensions of our globe, of the distribution of the gravity, seas' and continents' level, at the same time that it provided, to all the staffs, the solid bases on which the charts were built.

The works have grown under a skilful direction. In the year of the centenary of the metric system, the International Bureau was completing its first quarter of a century. Hirsch had the great satisfaction of seeing it in full prosperity; and if, last year before his death, his weakened health made him desire a well-earned rest and urged him to pass the secretariat of the Geodetic Association into younger hands, he found, still taking care of the International Bureau, a kind of paternal joy that made him overcome, by dint of energy, intolerable sufferings.

References

External links
 

1830 births
1901 deaths
19th-century German astronomers
19th-century Swiss astronomers
German geodesists